Nikki Wilson (née Smith) is a British television producer whose credits include Doctor Who and its spin-off The Sarah Jane Adventures. Her career had predominantly been as a script editor, in which capacity she worked on Trial & Retribution and Doctor Who.

Career

In 2008, she became a producer on the Doctor Who spinoff The Sarah Jane Adventures starting with "The Last Sontaran", and in 2010 following the departure of Julie Gardner, she was promoted to executive producer starting with "The Nightmare Man".

In 2009, she produced the Doctor Who special "The Waters of Mars".

In 2011, she became the new producer of the series Casualty, taking over from previous producer Oliver Kent. Her first episode "Next of Kin" was aired on 3 December 2011 and her last episode "What You Believe" aired on 24 August 2013.

In 2014 after five years away from the program, Wilson (alongside former producer Peter Bennett) returned to produce the eighth, ninth, and tenth seasons of the revived series, Wilson will produce the eleventh series under new executive producer Chris Chibnall.

Producing credits

References

External links

BBC television producers
British women television producers
British television producers
Living people
Year of birth missing (living people)